Veigel is a surname. Notable people with the surname include:

Al Veigel (1917–2012), American baseball player
Eva Marie Veigel (1724–1822), British dancer
Werner Veigel (1928–1995), German journalist and news presenter

See also
Vergel
Weigel